Al Anbaa is an Arabic newspaper based in Beirut, Lebanon. Founded in 1951 the print edition of the paper ceased publication in 2012. Since then it has been published as an online newspaper.

History and profile
Al Anbaa was established by Kamal Jumblatt, and the first issue appeared on 15 March 1951. As of 2008 the publisher and director-in-charge was Aziz El Metni who survived an arson attack in Qornet Shehwan on 19 January 2008. As of 2010 the editor-in-chief was Rami Hassib Rayess who was also a senior media officer at the Progressive Socialist Party.

The paper is close to the Walid Jumblatt's Progressive Socialist Party. Jumblatt publishes editorials in the paper. His father and the founder of the paper, Kamal Jumblatt, also regularly published articles in Al Anbaa. Some of them contained harsh criticisms against President Bechara El Khoury in the 1950s. Following the publication of his article dated 30 May 1952 in which he attacked the Lebanese regime this issue of Al Anbaa was confiscated by the government. 

Al Anbaa was critical of Syrian ruler, Hafez Assad, and Kataeb Party in the 1970s. It was a weekly print newspaper until 2012 when it became an only-online publication.

References

External links

1951 establishments in Lebanon
2012 disestablishments in Lebanon
Arabic-language newspapers
Defunct newspapers published in Lebanon
Defunct weekly newspapers
Newspapers published in Beirut
Online newspapers with defunct print editions
Publications established in 1951
Publications disestablished in 2012
Socialist newspapers
Weekly newspapers published in Lebanon